Philautus hosii is a species of frog in the family Rhacophoridae. The specific name of the synonym, Polypedates chlorophthalmus, refers to its "remarkable green iris", from the Greek for "green-eyed". Accordingly, the common name green-eyed tree frog has been coined for the species.

Its natural habitat is subtropical or tropical moist lowland forests. It is threatened by habitat loss.

Description
This species can be  in snout–vent length. The body is elongate. The dorsum is brown, with a thin dark gray line at back of the forehead. The lower flanks and anterior edge of thighs have dark blotches. The throat has dark pigmentation. The tympanum is distinct. The iris is bright green and the toes are webbed but the fingers lack webbing.

References

Endemic fauna of Borneo
Amphibians of Malaysia
Frogs of Asia
Amphibians described in 1895
Hosii
Taxonomy articles created by Polbot
Amphibians of Borneo